The Church of St Peter and St Paul, Uppingham is the Church of England parish church of Uppingham, Rutland. It is part of the Diocese of Peterborough.

History

The church is a Grade II* listed building. It is largely 14th century but was heavily restored in 1861 by Henry Parsons.

It consists of a western tower, nave with north and south aisles and clerestory, chancel and north chapel, organ chamber and vestry, and north and south porches. The tower is of three stages with angle buttresses and has a tall recessed spire with three tiers of lucarnes. The nave is of four bays and was lengthened by one bay in the 1861 restoration. The north aisle is from the Decorated period, the south aisle is Perpendicular. There are remnants of wall decoration on the south arcade consisting of red flowers and tendrils.

The chancel was rebuilt in 1861, incorporating black marble columns to the north chapel (Lady Chapel) and organ chamber. During the reconstruction some sculptured fragments of the twelfth century were found, two of which are now built into the wall on either side of the north door. A coffin lid of the thirteenth century was also found.

The font of 1863 was designed by George Edmund Street for All Saints', Cottesbrooke, Northamptonshire.

Rectors
Edmund Bonner 1528–1541
Edward Martin 1631–1637
Jeremy Taylor 1638–1643
Edward Jones 1786–1814
George Hutchinson 1815–1817
John Giles Dimock 1817–1858
William Wales 1859–1879
C. A. Yate 1879–1880
Prideaux Lightfoot 1880–1906
Edward Moore (Archdeacon of Oakham) 1907–1920
John Ivan Willett 1982–1999
Stephen Evans 2000–2010
Rachel Watts 2011–current

Bells

The tower has a ring of eight bells.

Treble 1773 Pack and Chapman of London
Second 1773 Pack and Chapman of London
Third 1772 Pack and Chapman of London
Fourth 1804 Robert Taylor of St Neots
Fifth 1895 John Taylor & Co of Loughborough
Sixth 1772 Pack and Chapman of London
Seventh 1772 Pack and Chapman of London
Tenor 1772 Pack and Chapman of London

Organ

The organ case was obtained from St Mary's Church, Nottingham in 1777 and is by Thomas Swarbrick dating from 1742. The organ itself is by Harrison and Harrison, built in 1894 and installed in 2006 by Peter Collins when it became redundant from All Saints', Eppleton, County Durham. A specification of the organ can be found on the National Pipe Organ Register.

References

Church of England church buildings in Rutland
Grade II* listed churches in Rutland
Uppingham